Pietro Povero (born June 23, 1899 in Vercelli) was an Italian professional football player.

Honours
 Serie A champion: 1929/30.

1899 births
People from Vercelli
Year of death missing
Italian footballers
Serie A players
U.S. Alessandria Calcio 1912 players
S.P.A.L. players
A.C. Reggiana 1919 players
Modena F.C. players
Inter Milan players
U.S. Triestina Calcio 1918 players
Ascoli Calcio 1898 F.C. players
Association football midfielders